The Atlin Road is a road in British Columbia and Yukon, Canada. It is designated as Highway 7 in Yukon, and has no official highway number in British Columbia.

It was built by the Canadian Army from 1950 to 1951, connecting the village of Atlin, British Columbia, with the Tagish Road just one mile west of the Alaska Highway at historic mile 866 (Jakes Corner).

By the mid-1980s, the Yukon section had been improved, being wide and straight, and the B.C. section, which has no official highway number, was narrow, winding, with some less-than-optimum grades. Most of the section in B.C. runs along the eastern shore of Atlin Lake.

By 2000, the B.C. section had been improved and partially paved, but there were complaints about the Yukon section.

By 2007, reconstruction had started on the Yukon section once again. The road has once again been widened and surfaced with a bitumen surface treatment. The completion of the most recent reconstruction was finished by 2016. By spring 2014, only 5 km of road, including two small bridges, remained to be reconstructed.

From Atlin, there are area roads both to the east and the south.

As of October 2017, both the Yukon and the British Columbia portions of the Atlin Road are in very good condition, with very few potholes.

Yukon territorial highways
Roads in British Columbia
Atlin District